Caetano... muitos carnavais... is a 1977 compilation album by Caetano Veloso. It exclusively features Carnaval songs and rhythms, such as samba, frevo and marchinhas.

Track listing

References 

Caetano Veloso albums
1977 compilation albums